NA-24 Charsadda-I is a constituency for the National Assembly of Pakistan. The constituency was formerly known as NA-8 (Charsadda-II) from 1977 to 2018. The name changed to NA-23 (Charsadda-I) after the delimitation in 2018 and to NA-24 (Charsadda-I) after the delimitation in 2022.

Members of Parliament

1977–2002: NA-8 Charsadda-II

2002–2018: NA-8 Charsadda-II

2018-2022: NA-23 Charsadda-I

Elections since 2002

2002 general election

A total of 1,673 votes were rejected.

2008 general election

A total of 1,842 votes were rejected.

2013 general election

A total of 4,625 votes were rejected.

2018 general election 

General elections were held on 25 July 2018.

See also
NA-23 Mardan-III
NA-25 Charsadda-II

References

External links 
 Election result's official website

23
23